Malaccamax is a naval architecture term for the largest tonnage of ship capable of fitting through the  Strait of Malacca. Bulk carriers and supertankers have been built to this tonnage, and the term is chosen for very large crude carriers (VLCC). They can transport oil from Arabia to China.

Similar terms Panamax, Suezmax and Seawaymax are used for the largest ships capable of fitting through the Panama Canal, the Suez Canal and Saint Lawrence Seaway, respectively. Aframax tankers are those with a deadweight tonnage of 80,000 to 120,000.

Problems

Some Chinamax and most Capesize and very large crude carriers cannot pass this strait. Ships such as Suezmax and Neopanamax can pass. Any post-Malaccamax ship would need to use even longer alternate routes because traditional seaways such as the Sunda Strait, between the Indonesian islands of Java and Sumatra would become too shallow for large ships. Other routes would therefore be required:
Lombok Strait, Dewakang Sill, Makassar Strait, then either east past Mindanao to the Philippine Sea or north through Sibutu Passage and Mindoro Strait
Ombai Strait, Banda Sea, Lifamatola Strait between the Sula Islands and Obi Islands, and Molucca Sea
around Australia

Artificially excavated new routes might also be a possibility:
deepening the Strait of Malacca, specifically at its minimum depth in the Singapore Strait,
the proposed Kra Canal, which however would take much more excavation.

See also 

 Maersk Triple E Class
 CMA CGM Marco Polo
 Cargo ship sizes Handymax,Trane tonnage, Panamax, Suezmax, Capesize

References

External links 
Ship sizes
Malaccamax

Ship types
Strait of Malacca
Ship measurements